Goran Arnaut (Serbian Cyrillic: Горан Арнаут; born 27 August 1979) is a former Serbian footballer who played mainly as a central midfielder.

Statistics

References

External links
 HLSZ profile 
 PrvaLiga profile 

1979 births
Living people
People from Bačka Topola
Serbian footballers
Association football midfielders
OFK Beograd players
FK Partizan players
FK Radnički 1923 players
FK Čukarički players
FK Teleoptik players
NK Primorje players
Slovenian PrvaLiga players
Shamakhi FK players
Serbian expatriate footballers
Expatriate footballers in Slovenia
Serbian expatriate sportspeople in Slovenia
Expatriate footballers in Azerbaijan
Serbian expatriate sportspeople in Azerbaijan
Expatriate footballers in Hungary
Serbian expatriate sportspeople in Hungary
FK Partizan non-playing staff